Edwin Gould Sr. (February 26, 1866 – July 12, 1933) was an American investor and railway official.

Biography
Gould was born in Manhattan, New York City, to railroad financier Jay Gould on February 26, 1866. He studied at Columbia University and was a member of the class of 1888 in the Columbia School of Mines. In 1896, he donated $18,000 to fund the crew team's boathouse, which is still named in his honor.

For many years, Gould lived in Dobbs Ferry, on a huge estate, Agawam, that sat along the Hudson River. Gould was a generous benefactor to the small village, and one of his contributions, Gould Park, remains an important recreational site for village residents.

He retired in 1926, and he died on July 12, 1933. After his dinner he complained of not feeling well, and died after midnight in his bed, at his estate Highwood in Oyster Bay Cove, New York. He was buried in the family mausoleum in Woodlawn Cemetery.

Time magazine writes on July 24, 1933:

Family
He married Sarah Cantine Shrady (c. 1870–1951) on October 26, 1892. She inherited US$10 million upon his death. They had two sons:
 Edwin Gould Jr., (1894–1917). He died from a hunting accident at the Jekyll Island Club on Jekyll Island, Georgia in 1917.
Frank Miller Gould (c. 1895–1945). He graduated from Yale in 1920 and married Florence Amelia Bacon on November 17, 1924. She was from Dallas, Texas. They had two children, and divorced in Reno, Nevada on May 6, 1944:
Marianne Gould (1926 –  January 21, 1957);
Edwin Jay Gould (1932–1993).
Frank married Helen Dolores (Roosen) Curran at Macon, Georgia, on June 7, 1944.  Frank died on January 13, 1945.

Accomplishments and social
In 1917–1918, he served with Squadron A, New York National Guard.
In 1918, he was major of ordnance in the First Brigade of the New York Guard.
He was chosen a captain in the Seventy-first regiment of the State National Guard.

He served as secretary of the St. Louis, Arkansas, and Texas Railway until it was reorganized as the St. Louis Southwestern Railway and later served as vice-president and president of the St. Louis Southwestern Railway.
He organized the Continental Match Company in 1894 (consolidated with the Diamond Match Company in 1899).
He was president of the Bowling Green Trust Company and vice-president of the American Writing Paper Company and president of the Five Boroughs Realty Company.
He was a director of many railroad and other corporations.

Social
He was a very active member of the Jekyll Island Club (aka the millionaires Club) on Jekyll Island, Georgia, along with J.P. Morgan and William Rockefeller among others.

References

Gould I, Edwin
Gould I, Edwin
Edwin
Gould I, Edwin
Gould I, Edwin
Burials in the Jay Gould Mausoleum
Columbia School of Mines alumni
People from Manhattan